Walter Roderer (3 July 1920 – 8 May 2012) was a Swiss actor and screenwriter. He played several leading film roles including the 1959 comedy The Model Husband.

Selected filmography

Actor
 Der 10. Mai (1957)
 The Model Husband (1959)
 The Man in the Black Derby (1960)
 The Maddest Car in the World (1975)

References

Bibliography 
 Goble, Alan. The Complete Index to Literary Sources in Film. Walter de Gruyter, 1999.

External links 
 

1920 births
2012 deaths
Swiss male film actors
20th-century Swiss male actors
Swiss screenwriters
Male screenwriters
People from St. Gallen (city)